Ethiopian Knights is an album by American trumpeter Donald Byrd featuring performances by Byrd with Thurman Green, Harold Land, Bobby Hutcherson, Joe Sample and others, recorded for the Blue Note label in 1971.

Reception
The AllMusic review by Steve Huey awarded the album four stars and stated "Even if it isn't quite as consistent as Kofi and Electric Byrd, Ethiopian Knights is another intriguing transitional effort that deepens the portrait of Byrd the acid jazz legend".

Track listing
All compositions by Donald Byrd except as indicated
 "The Emperor" - 15:14  
 "Jamie" - 3:38  
 "The Little Rasti" - 17:41

Source:

Personnel
Donald Byrd – trumpet 
Thurman Green – trombone 
Harold Land – tenor saxophone
Bobby Hutcherson – vibes
Joe Sample – organ
Bill Henderson III – electric piano
Don Peake – guitar
Greg Poree – guitar (tracks 1 & 2)
David T. Walker – guitar (track 3)
Wilton Felder – electric bass
Ed Greene – drums
Bobbye Porter Hall – congas, tambourine

Source:

References

Blue Note Records albums
Donald Byrd albums
Jazz-funk albums
1972 albums